George de Benneville (London, 25 July 1703 – Pennsylvania, 19 March 1793) was a physician and Christian Universalist preacher.

Biography
He was born in London in 1703 to aristocratic Huguenot French parents in the court of Queen Anne. While serving as a sailor during his adolescent years, de Benneville traveled around the world and began to question his religion and compare it to other world religions. He shed his Huguenot religion, developed his own ideas about Christianity, and became a preacher while still in his teens.

De Benneville had a mystical experience and later a near death experience which he described in The Life and Trance of Dr. George De Benneville.  These experiences convinced him that Hell is for purification, not punishment, and that, ultimately, all will be united with God.  He believed that God is absolutely good and in his love would never condemn any human to eternal damnation. He also preached that each human being has a dualistic nature; the outer, flesh-and-blood person is subject to the evils of the world and may choose to do good or to do wrong, while the inner, spiritlike person is crafted by God and is perfect, immaculate, and holy, and cannot be damned. Therefore, all human beings experience salvation.

Religious authorities in several nations were disturbed by evangelists such as de Benneville, and he was sentenced to death more than once. He preached and practiced medicine in France and Germany. After completing medical training in Europe, de Benneville immigrated to the American colonies during the mid-eighteenth century with others seeking religious tolerance. He settled in Pennsylvania and worked as a physician and apothecary in Oley, Berks County, using free time to continue his Universalist preaching.

de Benneville socialized and traded herbal preparations with Native American groups in the area. His beliefs stressed that all people everywhere are loved by God, and cultures, races, and sexes have no bearing on the worth of a human being. His beliefs stated clearly that the physical body is merely one part of a person.

George de Benneville died at home in Pennsylvania in 1793.

Notes

Selected References

External links
 
 
 

1703 births
1793 deaths
English Christian universalists
Clergy of the Universalist Church of America
18th-century Christian universalists
18th-century American clergy